The 2017 IHF Emerging Nations Handball Championship was the second edition of the IHF Emerging Nations Championship held in Bulgaria under the aegis of International Handball Federation. The tournament was held in two cities, Gabrovo and Veliko Tarnovo, from 12 to 18 June 2017.

A total of sixteen countries participated in the tournament out of which 15 are European except China.

Faroe Islands defended their title by defeating Turkey 26–25 in the final.

Three best-ranked teams from this tournament earned the right to participate at the 2nd phase of qualification for EURO 2020

Venues
The championship were played at two venues in Gabrovo and Veliko Tarnovo in Bulgaria.

Participating teams

1 Bold indicates champion for that year. Italics indicates host.

Draw
The draw was held on 7 March 2017 at 19:00.

Seeding

Referees
The following referees were appointed for the championship:

Preliminary round
The top two teams from each group advanced to the knockout stage.

All times are local (UTC+3).

Tie-breaking criteria
For the group stage of this tournament, where two or more teams in a group tied on an equal number of points, the finishing positions will be determined by the following tie-breaking criteria in the following order:
 Number of points obtained in the matches among the teams in question
 Goal difference in the matches among the teams in question
 Number of goals scored in the matches among the teams in question (if more than two teams finish equal on points)
 Goal difference in all the group matches
 Number of goals scored in all the group matches
 Drawing of lots

Group A

Group B

Group C

Group D

Knockout stage

9–16th place bracket

9–16th place quarterfinals

13–16th place semifinals

9–12th place semifinals

15th place game

13th place game

Eleventh place game

Ninth place game

Championship bracket

Quarterfinals

5–8th place semifinals

Semifinals

Seventh place game

Fifth place game

Third place game

Final

Final standings

Statistics

Top goalscorers

Source: IHF

Top goalkeepers

Source: IHF

References

External links
IHF website

2017
International sports competitions hosted by Bulgaria
IHF Emerging Nations Championship
IHF Emerging Nations Handball Championship
June 2017 sports events in Europe